"Politics" is a song by the American nu metal band Korn and The Matrix for Korn's seventh studio album, See You on the Other Side. It was released as the album's third single in August 2006 instead of the previous choice, "Love Song", and is the last Korn single to feature David Silveria on drums.

Concept

Chart performance 
The song did not reach the same success as "Twisted Transistor" and "Coming Undone", peaking at number eighteen on Billboard's Mainstream Rock Songs chart in January 2007. Promotional singles containing an array of remixes were issued to dance clubs, along with an exclusive iTunes EP coinciding with the United States midterm elections in November 2006. This would give Korn their third consecutive (and overall) charting single on Billboards Dance/Club Play Songs chart, with a peak of number 20.

Charts

Music video 
The video was shot live on August 26, 2006, at the Alpine Valley Amphitheatre in East Troy, Wisconsin, during the Family Values Tour. Along with a traditional camera shoot by Chris Kantrowitz, the band put handheld cameras in the hands of ten members of its fanclub and local area fans who were given all access passes to shoot the performance and any behind-the-scenes footage that they chose. It was released exclusively on MP3.com on October 3, 2006.

Track listing

Digital download 
"Politics" (Clean/Explicit) – 3:16
"Twisted Transistor" (Live in Athens, Clean/Explicit) – 3:24
"Hypocrites" (Live in Holland, Clean/Explicit) – 4:06

Digital election day EP 
"Politics (Morel Pink Noise Mix)" – 4:00
"Politics (Claude Le Gache Edit)" – 3:54
"Politics (Gomi Remix Radio Edit)" – 4:03

US promo CD 
"Politics"

US promo maxi-single CD #1 
"Politics (Claude LeGache Club Mix)" – 7:25
"Politics (Passengerez Neokon Remix)" – 6:25
"Politics (Claude LeGache Edit)" – 3:54
"Politics (Claude LeGache Mixshow Remix)" – 5:57

US promo maxi-single CD #2 
"Politics (Gomi Main Mix)" – 7:33
"Politics (Gomi Radio Edit)" – 4:03
"Politics (Claude LeGache Dub Mix)" – 7:22
"Politics (Claude LeGache French Dub Mix)" – 8:06
"Politics (Dave Bascombe Main)" – 2:55
"Politics (Dave Bascombe Instrumental)" – 2:54

References 

2006 singles
Korn songs
2005 songs
Songs written by Reginald Arvizu
Songs written by Lauren Christy
Songs written by Jonathan Davis
Songs written by Graham Edwards (musician)
Songs written by James Shaffer
Songs written by David Silveria
Songs written by Scott Spock
Virgin Records singles
Song recordings produced by the Matrix (production team)